The Trippet stones or Trippet stones circle is a stone circle located on Manor Common in Blisland,  north northeast of Bodmin on Bodmin Moor in Cornwall, UK. The Stripple stones are nearby.

Description
It is made of eight upright granite stones with four others that have fallen. William Lukis suggested there may originally have been as many as twenty-six menhirs that suffered at the hands of stone-breakers. Aubrey Burl suggested twenty eight, set up on opposite facing pairs and suggests the name represents the folklore belief that the stones were girls punished for tripping lightly on Sabbath.

The Stripple stones are visible around  eastwards over boggy ground. John Barnatt said that the Trippet stones "may replace (or complement) the Stripple stones as part of an overall building programme in the western half of Bodmin Moor".

Archaeology
The Trippet stones were examined in 1908 by H. St. George Gray who excavated the nearby Stripple stones in 1905 and found a few flint flakes and an entrance from this facing southwest, directly towards the Trippet stones.

Alignments
Norman Lockyer visited the site in 1907 and suggested the date of the circle's construction to be around 1700 BC by calculating an alignment of Arcturus over Rough Tor. Lockyer also noted an eleven degree alignment between Trippet stones and Leaze stone circle, but suggested if this alignment were to mean anything, it would have to be with regards stellar rising alignments as it is outside of the sun's path.

Literature

References

External links

 Cornwall's Archaeological Heritage – field guide to accessible sites – Trippet stones
 Illustrated entry in the Megalithic Portal
 Illustrated entry in the Modern Antiquarian
 

Bodmin Moor
Stone circles in Cornwall